John Albert Sheppard (September 1, 1875 – 1947) was an educator, farmer and political figure in Saskatchewan, Canada. He represented Moose Jaw County in the Legislative Assembly of Saskatchewan from 1905 to 1916 as a Liberal.

He was born in Mount Forest, Ontario in 1875, the son of John Sheppard and Margaret Reid, and was educated in Mount Forest and at the normal school in Toronto. Sheppard taught school in Ontario and in the Moose Jaw district. In 1896, he married Florence Herring. Sheppard was speaker for the Saskatchewan assembly from 1912 to 1916. He was defeated by John Edwin Chisholm in a 1916 by-election requested by Sheppard to "give him the opportunity of vindicating his character by an appeal to the people". Sheppard was reacting to the findings of a Royal Commission which found him guilty on two charges of receiving money in return for liquor licenses. He died in 1947.

References 

1875 births
1947 deaths
Saskatchewan Liberal Party MLAs
Speakers of the Legislative Assembly of Saskatchewan